Juan José Castillo Izarra (born March 13, 1968) is a retired male long-distance runner from Peru.

He is a one-time winner of the Buenos Aires Marathon (1997) in a time of 2:18:35 hours. He represented his native South American country in the men's 10,000 metres at the 1992 Summer Olympics in Barcelona, Spain.

International competitions

References
 sports-reference

External links

1968 births
Living people
Peruvian male marathon runners
Peruvian male long-distance runners
Peruvian male steeplechase runners
Olympic athletes of Peru
Athletes (track and field) at the 1992 Summer Olympics
South American Games bronze medalists for Peru
South American Games medalists in athletics
Competitors at the 1990 South American Games
Athletes (track and field) at the 1991 Pan American Games
Pan American Games competitors for Peru
20th-century Peruvian people